Martín de Goiti (c. 1534 – 1575) was one of the soldiers who accompanied the Spanish colonization of the East Indies and the Pacific in 1565. From his base in Mexico City, he led the expedition to Manila ordered by Miguel López de Legazpi in 1569. He then engaged in battles against Rajah Sulayman, Rajah Matanda, and Lakandula of the kingdoms in Luzon in order to colonise the land.

The Battles for Manila (1570 – 1575) 
The Spaniards arrived in Luzon on May 8, 1570, and camped on the shores of Manila Bay for several weeks, while forming an alliance with the Muslims. On May 24, 1570, disputes and hostility erupted between the two groups. The Spaniards occupied the city of Tondo where they were greeted with thousands of warriors. There, they defeated most of Tariq Suleiman's, Rajah Matanda's, and Lakan Dula's people. The Spaniards marched their armies towards the Pasig River, and occupied the settlements in Manila on June 6, 1570, and burned them.

Guerrilla warfare broke out following the battle, which continued for about ten months. The Spaniards fortified themselves in the area and constructed their military barracks of Fort Santiago, which became their outpost for trade with Mexico. The Spaniards gained control of the settlements on June 24, 1571, after the arrival of Miguel López de Legazpi in Manila, who agreed to a peace agreement sealed by betrothing one of his half-caste (Half Aztec and Half Spanish) daughters to Batang Dula, heir apparent of Lakan Dula.

The Spanish colonization paved the way for the establishment of Manila as a permanent settlement and capital city of the Spanish East Indies. He later explored Pampanga, Pangasinan and founded several Spanish cities in Luzon between the periods of 1571 -1573. De Goiti, along with other soldiers were granted with haciendas (estates) for the lands they had conquered, by Philip II of Spain.

In 1574, De Goiti fought in the war during the invasion of about 3,000 Chinese sea pirates who had sailed from the South China sea. Their leader, Limahong, besieged on the Spanish settlements in Manila. De Goiti was killed by these pirates. Most of the Spanish reinforcements came from Vigan and Cebu. Martín de Goiti's second in command, Juan de Salcedo left Ilocos Sur, after hearing the news and traveled to Manila where he discovered their settlements had been ceded to the pirates. Salcedo's forces attacked and drove the pirates out of Manila. Limahong and his fleets retreated to Pangasinan where they re-organize their forces.

In 1575, Salcedo's army marched north to Pangasinan, in pursuit of the pirates, and besieged them for three months.

Legacy
De Goiti's  remains were laid to rest in a tomb inside the San Agustin Church, in Intramuros.

See also 
Battle of Manila (1574)
History of the Philippines

References
de Morga, Antonio. (2004). The Project Gutenberg Edition Book : History of the Philippine Islands - 1521 to the Beginning of the XVII century. Volume 1 and 2.
López de Legazpi, Don Miguel. (1564–1572). Cartas al Rey Don Felipe II : sobre la expedicion, conquistas y progresos de las islas Felipinas. Sevilla, España.

External links 
 Act of Taking Possession of Luzon (Article)

Spanish conquistadors
People of Spanish colonial Philippines
1534 births
1575 deaths
Basque conquistadors
Spanish city founders
Spanish military personnel killed in action
16th century in the Spanish East Indies
16th-century Spanish people
Burials at San Agustin Church (Manila)
Filipino city founders